Nikolay Ivanovich Merkushkin (born 5 February 1951) is a Russian politician who served as Governor of Samara Oblast from 2012 to 2017 and as Head of the Republic of Mordovia from 1995 to 2012. From 24 January to 22 September 1995, he served as Chairman of the State Assembly of Mordovia.

Career
Merkushkin was an electrical engineer before entering politics. He was reelected president of Mordovia in 1998 and 2003 with 80% of the vote. He has maintained popularity by having a relatively stable economy in the republic and paying salaries and pensions on time. He has prevented opponents from running against him by disqualifying candidates which seem to have more than 3% invalid signatures. Merkushkin is married to Taisiya Merkushkina, an ethnic Erzyan and has two sons.

On 10 May 2012 Merkushkin resigned to become Acting Governor of Samara Oblast. He was replaced by his PM Vladimir Volkov.

On 25 September 2017 he was removed from the position of Governor of the Samara Region.

Honours and awards
Order For Merit to the Fatherland 3rd class
Order For Merit to the Fatherland 4th class
Order of the Red Banner of Labour
Order of Friendship of Peoples
Medal "For Labour Valour"
Medal "For Transforming the Non-Black Earth of the RSFSR"

References

External links 
 Глава Республики Мордовия Н.И.Меркушкин награжден орденом "За заслуги перед Отечеством" III степени 
 Глава Республики Мордовия Николай Иванович Меркушкин 
 Official website of the Republic of Mordovia 

1951 births
Living people
People from Mordovia
Mordvin people
Heads of the Republic of Mordovia
United Russia politicians
21st-century Russian politicians
Russian electrical engineers
Recipients of the Order "For Merit to the Fatherland", 3rd class
Recipients of the Order of Friendship of Peoples
Governors of Samara Oblast